Elaeocarpus calomala is a species of flowering plant in the family Elaeocarpaceae.
 
Elaeocarpus calomala is a tree commonly found in the Philippines and used to create religious images known as santo. In the Philippines this tree is locally known as anakle, bunsilak or binting-dalaga (Tagalog, "maiden's leg"). It is similar to native tree species known as batikuling and like the olongas, another native tree species in the Philippines.

See also
 List of Elaeocarpus species

References

calomala
Trees of the Philippines
Taxa named by Francisco Manuel Blanco